Top Pops is an original jazz compilation by Nat King Cole. It was released initially as 8 Top Pops in the 10-inch Capitol Records' LP format in 1952.  An expanded (12-track) version was reissued in 1955 in a 12-inch LP format as Top Pops.  Four additional "bonus" tracks were added to later CD reissues.

Track listing

10-inch LP (1952) 
    "Somewhere Along the Way" (Kurt Adams, Sammy Gallop) - 2:52
    "Walkin' My Baby Back Home" (Fred E. Ahlert, Roy Turk) - 2:38
    "Faith Can Move Mountains" (Ben Raleigh, Guy Wood) - 3:12
    "Because You're Mine" (Sammy Cahn, Nicholas Brodszky) - 3:10
    "Funny (Not Much)" (Philip Broughton, Bob Merrill, Marcia Neil, Hughie Prince) - 2:57
    "I'm Never Satisfied" - 2:11
    "The Ruby And The Pearl" (Jay Livingston, Ray Evans) - 3:12
    "A Weaver of Dreams" - 2:45

12-inch LP (1955) 
 "Somewhere Along the Way" (Kurt Adams, Sammy Gallop) - 2:52
 "Walkin' My Baby Back Home" (Fred E. Ahlert, Roy Turk) - 2:38
 "Faith Can Move Mountains" (Ben Raleigh, Guy Wood) - 3:12
 "Funny (Not Much)" (Philip Broughton, Bob Merrill, Marcia Neil, Hughie Price) - 2:57
 "Hold My Hand" - 3:03
 "Teach Me Tonight" (Sammy Cahn, Gene DePaul) - 3:09
 "I'm Never Satisfied" - 2:11
 "Because You're Mine" (Sammy Cahn, Nicholas Brodszky) - 3:10 
 "The Ruby And The Pearl" (Jay Livingston, Ray Evans) - 3:12
 "A Weaver of Dreams" - 2:45
 "Papa Loves Mambo" (Al Hoffman, Dick Manning, Bickley S. Reichmer) - 2:39
 "If I Give My Heart To You" (Jimmy Brewster, Jimmy Crane, Al Jacobs) - 2:58
Bonus tracks on later CD re-issue:
 "You Will Never Grow Old" - 2:49     
 "How (How Do I Go About It?)" - 2:45   
 "When I'm Alone" - 2:49
 "A Fool Was I" (Roy Alfred) - 2:50

References 
Capitol Records H-9110
A Pile o' Cole's Nat King Cole Website
Top Pops 10-inch LP (1952) at Allmusic
Top Pops 12-inch LP (1955) at CD Universe
Top Pops 12-inch LP (1955) at Allmusic
8 Top Pops at discogs.com
Capitol album discography at bsnpubs.com 

Nat King Cole albums
1952 albums
Capitol Records albums